James Houston Thomas (September 22, 1808 – August 4, 1876) was an American politician and a member of the United States House of Representatives for Tennessee's 6th congressional district.

Biography
Thomas was born in Iredell County, North Carolina on September 22, 1808. He attended the rural schools and graduated from Jackson College, Columbia, Tennessee in 1830. He studied law, was admitted to the bar in 1831, and commenced practice in Columbia, Tennessee. He owned slaves. He married Margaret Meeds Stevens.

Career
From 1836 to 1842, Thomas served as Attorney General of Tennessee.

Thomas was elected as a Democrat to the Thirtieth and Thirty-first Congresses. Though he was not a successful candidate for re-election in 1850 to the Thirty-second Congress, he was later elected to the Thirty-sixth Congress. He served from March 4, 1847 to March 3, 1851 and from March 4, 1859 to March 3, 1861.  He resumed the practice of law in Columbia, Tennessee. He was a Delegate from Tennessee to the Confederate Provisional Congress from 1861 to 1862.

Death
Thomas died in Fayetteville, Tennessee in Lincoln County on August 4, 1876 (age 67 years, 317 days). He is interred at St. John's Cemetery in Ashwood in Maury County, Tennessee.

References

External links

 

1808 births
1876 deaths
People from Iredell County, North Carolina
American people of Welsh descent
Democratic Party members of the United States House of Representatives from Tennessee
Deputies and delegates to the Provisional Congress of the Confederate States
Tennessee Attorneys General
American slave owners
People from Columbia, Tennessee
19th-century American politicians
People of Tennessee in the American Civil War